is a Japanese manga series written and illustrated by Takao Aoyagi. It was serialized in Shogakukan's Monthly Shōnen Sunday from May 2009 to August 2013, with its chapters collected in seven tankōbon volumes. It was adapted into a Japanese television drama series that premiered on TV Tokyo in 2011. The opening of the series is "Ready Go" by 4Minute.

Summary
A young man wakes up one day to find himself in El-Palacio, a dwindling all-female professional wrestling organization which currently houses five wrestlers.  He learns that he was nearly killed in a traffic accident, but was saved by Ouka Shumisen, one of the wrestlers, but thanks to the rough nature of the rescue suffered a blow to the head and developed amnesia, rendering him unable to remember his identity.  Ouka declares that the young man is now her manservant, naming him "Tadasuke Ooka" after the legendary samurai and magistrate, and can stay at El-Palacio to serve as their referee and perform general tasks while he tries to recover his memory.

Characters

Suffering from amnesia, he does not remember anything about his past identity and lives at El-Palacio performing menial jobs such as cleaning and laundry as well as serving as the referee during matches. Ouka gave him his current name, which comes from a historical samurai revered for being a fair and just magistrate. Though good-natured and reliable, he is often put at wit's end by Ouka's antics, and starts off not understanding many of the conventions of pro wrestling. However, he takes to his job with a passion and strives to live up to his adopted name, officiating matches honestly even if he does not personally care for the results. The primary example of this comes from the match between Ouka and Azumi, where "ownership" of Tadasuke himself was at stake; the owners of Azumi's wrestling organization H·E·At offer Tadasuke the opportunity to rig the match and stay with El-Palacio, but he refuses and oversees the match fairly. At one point he recovers a dream-like memory of being saved from bullies by a young girl, who is strongly implied to be Ouka.

El-Palacio's leader and the face of the group. Loud, brash and pushy, she does what she wants and does not care what other people think. This attitude extends to her in-ring performances, which have led to fans labeling her a heel, much to her annoyance. Underneath her rough exterior she cares deeply about the members of El-Palacio, but is more of a "sink or swim" mentor rather than one who simply tells people what they need to know. Along with Mariko, she is one of the original members of El-Palacio during its glory days and wants to restore it to prominence, which leads to her doing reckless things to attract attention. Ouka usually treats Tadasuke more like a pet than a person, but as he gets acclimated to his new life and becomes an honest and reliable referee, she begins seeing him as a man and finds herself falling in love with him. It is implied through Tadasuke's recovered memory that they knew each other as children, but Ouka does not acknowledge this.

A member of El-Palacio, Bunny is a Luchador-style wrestler, using high-flying aerial moves and wearing a mask with fake rabbit ears which give her her stage name. Bunny is El-Palacio's primary face, presenting herself as a "hero of justice" who is beloved by all the neighborhood children. As part of her persona, she claims to gain super-strength by eating carrots (much like Popeye and his spinach); as a consequence, Bunny is often given carrots in bulk by local merchants and children. Cool and level-headed, Bunny is shown to be an excellent seamstress, having made her own mask and occasionally sewing costumes for the others; however, she is a terrible chef. She eventually bonds with Tadasuke over their similar situations, as both of them have taken up new names and identities, and asks him what he'll do if he recovers his memory and dislikes the person he used to be.
Bunny's past is sore spot for her and she refuses to discuss it with anyone. For unknown reasons she was driven to suicide but saved by Ouka, who gave her a mask and said it would be better to metaphorically "die" and be reborn as a new person than to give up entirely. She never takes off her mask except when she is alone in the bath; the only residents of El-Palacio who have seen her real face are Ouka and Tadasuke (who accidentally saw her as she was stepping out of the shower with a towel draped over her head). Her name may be an homage to Cutie Honey protagonist Honey Kisaragi, emphasized in one match where she changes between a few costumed personae while shouting "Bunny Flash!"
In the live action series, the luchador aspect of the character is dropped; instead, she goes by her real name (Sae Kisaragi) and fights using karate.

Sweet-natured, considerate, and an excellent chef, Mariko is the reliable big sister-figure of El-Palacio. However, all that changes when she steps into the ring and becomes , a cold, ruthless, trigger-happy cowgirl heel. The other members of El-Palacio accept this in stride and treat Mariko and Mary as two separate people, but Tadasuke is upset that some fans (particularly those who do not understand the concept of kayfabe, like Bunny's legion of grade-school fans) treat such a friendly and loving person with fear. However, Mariko is shown to be sensitive about her age (at 25 she is the oldest of the girls), and occasionally slips into "Mary Mode" when people call her old, something Ouka does often. She is also observant, being the only person aware of both Ouka and Hina's feelings for Tadasuke.

One of the younger members of El-Palacio, Itsuka is a high school student who has a very casual personality. She usually skips school, feeling it is a waste of time and believing that her classmates do not understand or respect pro wrestling. She is also the biggest eater among the wrestlers at El-Palacio. Her in-ring persona is based on Sun Wukong from the classic novel Journey to the West.

A 14-year-old middle schooler and the youngest of the wrestlers at El-Palacio. Sweet and caring, Hina is weak-willed and unsure of herself. She has feelings for Tadasuke, but lacks the confidence to do anything about it; in turn, she treats him the nicest of El-Palacio's residents, making it easy for the others to realize why. Her cute appearance and personality evoke moe feelings, winning her many male fans who are highly jealous of Tadasuke's closeness with her.

The top-ranked champion of H·E·At (Hyper Entertainment Athletes), a rival wrestling organization. She was once a member of El-Palacio during its glory days alongside Ouka and Mariko; however, when the organization went into decline, she left for the limelight of H·E·At. She returns to El-Palacio to claim the Violet Belt, the female wrestling champion's belt which had been in Ouka's possession; when Ouka shows that she does not care and would gladly hand it over, Azumi makes the stakes personal by challenging Ouka to a match for "ownership" of Tadasuke as well as the belt. She is shown to still care about El-Palacio, sending one of H·E·At's rookie wrestlers there in order to further develop her skills.

The number-one ranked heel at H·E·At, tied in the national rankings with Ouka. Her wrestling persona is that of a violent, bloodthirsty carpenter who uses weapons like chisels, hammers, and barbed wire against her opponents. During his day at H·E·At, Tadasuke learns that much like Mariko, she is a normal person outside of the ring who really does work as a carpenter as her day job.

Exclusive to the live action series. A motherly woman who runs the snack shop "Erika" in the same neighborhood as El-Palacio. She dislikes the impudent attitude displayed by El-Palacio's residents and begins over-eating, which by the end of the series transforms her into a wrestler named "Erika" (portrayed by Aja Kong).

Media

Manga
Written and illustrated by Takao Aoyagi, Welcome to the El-Palacio was serialized in Shogakukan's Monthly Shōnen Sunday from May 12, 2009, to August 12, 2013. Shogakukan collected its chapters in seven tankōbon volumes, released from January 12, 2010, to October 11, 2013.

Volume list

References

External links
  

2009 manga
2011 Japanese television series debuts
2011 Japanese television series endings
Comedy anime and manga
Fiction about amnesia
Japanese television dramas based on manga
Professional wrestling in anime and manga
Shogakukan franchises
Shogakukan manga
Shōnen manga
TV Tokyo original programming